Dale Leon Bumpers (August 12, 1925 – January 1, 2016) was an American lawyer and politician who served as the 38th Governor of Arkansas (1971–1975) and in the United States Senate (1975–1999). He was a member of the Democratic Party. Prior to his death, he was counsel at the Washington, D.C., office of law firm Arent Fox LLP, where his clients included Riceland Foods and the University of Arkansas for Medical Sciences.

Background
Bumpers was born August 12, 1925, in Charleston in Franklin County, in west central Arkansas, near the larger city of Fort Smith, the son of William Rufus Bumpers (1888–1949), who served in the Arkansas House of Representatives in the early 1930s, and the former Lattie Jones (1889–1949). Bumpers's brother, Raymond J. Bumpers (1912–1916), died of dysentery. Another older brother, Carroll Bumpers, was born in 1921. He has a sister named Margaret. Bumpers's parents died five days apart in March 1949 of injuries sustained in an automobile accident; the couple is interred at Nixon Cemetery in Franklin County.

Bumpers attended public schools and the University of Arkansas at Fayetteville in Washington County. He served in the United States Marine Corps from 1943 to 1946 during World War II. Bumpers graduated from Northwestern University Law School in Chicago, Illinois, in 1951. From his time in Illinois, he became a great admirer of Adlai Stevenson, II, the Democratic presidential candidate in 1952 and 1956. Bumpers was admitted to the Arkansas bar in 1952 and began practicing law in his hometown that same year. He was from 1952 to 1970 the Charleston city attorney. While serving as city attorney, he convinced the school board to accept the Brown v. Board of Education ruling integrating public schools. Charleston was the first School District in the former Confederate States of America to fully integrate, an accomplishment that Bumpers was very proud of.

Bumpers lost his 1962 bid for the same state House seat once represented by his father, who had wanted to run for the United States House of Representatives but could not amass the funding to do so.

Governor of Arkansas

Bumpers was virtually unknown when he announced his campaign for governor in 1970. Despite his lack of name recognition, his oratorical skills, personal charm, and outsider image put him in a runoff election for the Democratic nomination with former governor Orval Faubus. Two other serious candidates were Attorney General Joe Purcell of Benton in Saline County and the outgoing Speaker of the Arkansas House, Hayes McClerkin of Texarkana. Bumpers barely edged out Purcell for the runoff berth but then easily defeated Faubus. In the general election, he swamped the incumbent moderate Republican Governor Winthrop Rockefeller. It was a Democratic year nationally, and the tide benefited Bumpers. Like Jimmy Carter of Georgia, Reubin O. Askew in Florida and John C. West of South Carolina, Bumpers was often described as a new kind of Southern Democrat who would bring reform to his state and the Democratic Party. His victory over Rockefeller ushered in a new era of youthful reform-minded governors, including two of his successors, David Pryor (who would later serve alongside Bumpers in the Senate) and future U.S. President Bill Clinton.

In the 1972 Democratic primary, Bumpers easily defeated two opponents, including the highly regarded State Senator Q. Byrum Hurst of Hot Springs. In the general election, he defeated the Republican Len E. Blaylock of Perry County even as Richard M. Nixon was handily winning Arkansas in the presidential race.

U.S. Senate elections
Bumpers was elected to the United States Senate in 1974. He unseated the incumbent James William Fulbright in the Democratic primary by a wide margin and then overwhelmed the Republican lawyer and banker John Harris Jones (born 1922) of Pine Bluff. In the 1974 Senate race, Jones accused Bumpers of excessive spending as governor, citing the construction of a $186 million state office complex. Bumpers not only ignored Jones but instead campaigned mostly for the young Democrat Bill Clinton, who failed in that heavily Democratic year to unseat Republican U.S. Representative John Paul Hammerschmidt in Arkansas's 3rd congressional district. Bumpers polled 461,056 votes (84.9%) to Jones's 82,026 (15.1%), the weakest Republican showing since the insurance executive Victor M. Wade of Batesville lost to Fulbright in 1944.

Time magazine wrote that "many to their sorrow have had trouble taking Bumpers seriously ... Dandy Dale, the man with one speech, a shoeshine, and a smile."

In 1980, Bumpers comfortably survived, 477,905 votes (59.1 percent) to 330,576 (40.9 percent), the Ronald W. Reagan victory in Arkansas by defeating the Republican candidate, William P. "Bill" Clark (born 1943), a Little Rock investment banker who filed for the Senate only one hour prior to the deadline. (This William Clark is unrelated to the Reagan confidante William P. Clark, Jr. (1931–2013)). In his unsuccessful 1976 race as a Democrat for Arkansas's 2nd congressional district seat, "Bill" Clark had passed out twenty thousand Clark candy bars but received fewer votes and was saddled with an unpaid campaign debt exceeding $30,000. Clark accused Bumpers of being "fuzzy on the issues" and challenged Bumpers's support for gasoline rationing during the energy crisis. Clark criticized Bumpers for having voted against defense appropriations twenty-three times between 1975 and 1978 and noted, "Only this year [when seeking reelection] he has voted for a couple of defense items." Clark questioned Bumpers's opposition to school prayer and support for the Panama Canal Treaties of 1978, an issue which Reagan had used against President Jimmy Carter as well. Clark further claimed that Bumpers had derided citizens of Newton County, a frequent Republican stronghold in Arkansas, as "stupid hill people".<ref>Arkansas Gazette, November 2, 1980</ref> Newton County in turn cast 57.2 percent of its votes for Clark, who prevailed in twelve of the state's seventy-five counties, mostly those in the northwestern section of the state. Clark also carried Bumpers's home county of Franklin. The Republican hopeful asked voters, "If Dale Bumpers doesn't vote for you, why should you vote for him?"

Unlike Bumpers, Bill Clinton lost in the Reagan electoral vote landslide, temporarily sidelined by the Republican Frank D. White. In 1986, Bumpers defeated his Republican opponent, later U.S. Representative for Arkansas's 3rd congressional district and Governor Asa Hutchinson. In 1992, after besting State Auditor Julia Hughes Jones with 64 percent of the vote in the Democratic primary, he defeated future governor Mike Huckabee in the general election. The next year, Jones switched to the GOP and unsuccessfully ran for secretary of state in 1994. In 1998, when Bumpers retired, the Democratic choice, former U. S. Representative Blanche Lambert Lincoln of Arkansas's 1st congressional district, comfortably defeated the Republican nominee, Fay Boozman, a state senator who was later the Arkansas Department of Health director under Governor Huckabee.

Senate tenure

Bumpers was elected to the Senate four times, beginning with his huge victory over Fulbright, the veteran chairman of the United States Senate Foreign Relations Committee. Bumpers chaired the Senate Committee on Small Business and Entrepreneurship from 1987 until 1995, when the GOP took control of the Senate for a dozen years following the 1994 elections. Bumpers served as ranking minority member of the Senate Committee on Energy and Natural Resources from 1997 until his retirement in 1999. In the Senate, Bumpers was known for his oratorical skills and for his prodigious respect for the Constitution of the United States. He never supported any constitutional amendment.

Bumpers decided not to seek the Democratic presidential nomination in 1984 and 1988, despite support from many colleagues, including Senator Paul Simon of Illinois, who ultimately also contested the 1988 nomination won by Michael Dukakis. Initially named as one of Walter Mondale's top potential choices for his vice presidential running mate in 1984, he took his name out of the running early in the process.

Bumpers stated that his main reason for not running was fear of "a total disruption of the closeness my family has cherished."  Many observers felt that Bumpers perhaps lacked the obsessive ambition required of a presidential candidate, especially one who would have started out the process with low name identification. Another factor often mentioned was Bumpers's key vote in killing labor law reform in 1978, a vote that angered organized labor and had clearly not been forgotten by labor leaders nearly a decade later.

Clinton impeachment
After his retirement from the Senate, Bumpers, a self-declared close friend of President Clinton, acted as defense attorney during Clinton's impeachment trial. He gave an impassioned closing argument during the Senate trial.

Quotes from the closing argument of the White House presentation, January 21, 1999:

Honors
In 1995, the University of Arkansas-Fayetteville founded the Dale Bumpers College of Agricultural, Food and Life Sciences in his honor.

In 2014, the White River National Wildlife Refuge in Arkansas was renamed "Dale Bumpers White River National Wildlife Refuge".  At a dedication ceremony, Daniel M. Ashe, director of the United States Fish and Wildlife Service, said:
The Service is proud to recognize the many contributions Senator Bumpers has made to give many future generations the same opportunity to enjoy Arkansas' natural beauty as we have had.  He is a giant among conservationists and a visionary who followed an unconventional path to set aside some of Arkansas' last wild places. It is fitting that he will be forever linked with the White River.

Causes
Bumpers and his wife Betty were both known for their dedication to the cause of childhood immunization. The Dale and Betty Bumpers Vaccine Research Center (VRC) at the National Institutes of Health was established by former president Clinton to facilitate research in vaccine development.

Early in his legal career, the Charleston School Board asked his advice on how it should respond to the United States Supreme Court decision in the 1954 case of Brown v. Board of Education of Topeka, Kansas, which found the segregation of public schools on the basis of race to be unconstitutional. Bumpers advised the school board to comply with the decision immediately. In July 1954, the board voted to desegregate its schools, and on August 23, 1954, the school year began with eleven African-American children attending schools in Charleston. This prompt action to desegregate public schools was rare: The Charleston School District was the first in the eleven states that comprised the former Confederacy to integrate their public schools following the Supreme Court decision.

Bumpers opposed constitutional amendments throughout his Senate tenure and was critical of his Republican colleague, Jesse Helms of North Carolina for attempting that route to enact conservative policy proposals. However, Bumpers said that he worked well with Republican leaders Howard Baker and Bob Dole.

Death
After a period of failing health, Bumpers died on January 1, 2016, at his home in Little Rock at the age of 90. He had Alzheimer's disease and had sustained a broken hip shortly before his death.

Bumpers in fiction
In Jeffrey Archer's 1977 novel Shall We Tell the President?, Bumpers was elected as the Vice President of the United States in a ticket headed by Ted Kennedy, defeating Ronald Reagan during the 1984 election. In the 1986 revised edition of the novel, Archer replaced Kennedy with the fictional character of Florentyna Kane, and Bumpers with the real-life Senator Bill Bradley of New Jersey.

Electoral history of Dale Bumpers

 Books 
 

 Citations 

 General references
 Bumpers, Dale. The Best Lawyer in a One-Lawyer Town: A Memoir. New York: Random House, 2003.
 Clinton, Bill (2005). My Life. Vintage. .
 Complete text and audio and video of Dale Bumpers's Closing Defense Arguments at the Impeachment Trial of William Jefferson Clinton
 
 "Defense Who's Who", The Washington Post, January 19, 1999.
 Encyclopedia of Arkansas History & Culture'' entry: Dale Leon Bumpers
 Transcript: Former Senator Dale Bumpers – Senate Floor January 21, 1999

External links

 U.S. Senator Dale Bumpers official U.S. Senate website (archived from 1998)
 Oral History Interview with Dale Bumpers from Oral Histories of the American South
 

|-

|-

|-

|-

|-

1925 births
2016 deaths
20th-century American lawyers
20th-century American politicians
21st-century American lawyers
American memoirists
United States Marine Corps personnel of World War II
American United Methodists
Arkansas lawyers
Justices of the Arkansas Supreme Court
City and town attorneys in the United States
Democratic Party governors of Arkansas
Democratic Party United States senators from Arkansas
Clinton–Lewinsky scandal
Military personnel from Arkansas
Northwestern University Pritzker School of Law alumni
People from Charleston, Arkansas
United States Marine Corps officers
Candidates in the 1980 United States presidential election
University of Arkansas alumni
Members of the defense counsel for the impeachment trial of Bill Clinton